Washington County is a county located in the northeastern part of the U.S. state of Oklahoma. As of the 2020 census, the population was 52,455. Its county seat is Bartlesville. Named for President George Washington, it is the second smallest county in Oklahoma in total area, adjacent to the largest county in Oklahoma, Osage County.

Washington County comprises the Bartlesville, OK Micropolitan Statistical Area, which is also included in the Tulsa-Muskogee-Bartlesville, OK Combined Statistical Area. It is located along the border with Kansas.

History
The Osage ceded their land claims in 1825, and the Federal Government allowed the Western Cherokee to settle in this area in 1828. The 1835 Treaty of New Echota confirmed Cherokee ownership of the land. The area now covered by Washington County was part of the Cherokee Saline District between 1840 and 1856 and the Cooweescoowee District from 1856 to 1906.

The first post office was established in 1859 at the confluence of Butler Creek and the Caney River by James L. Butler. Known as Little Verdigris, the settlement also had a trading post and a school. The Civil War caused most of the inhabitants to move away and the post office closed in 1866. In 1867, the Cherokees sold 157,600 acres to the Eastern Delaware

In 1870, Nelson Carr built a grist mill along the Caney River, which he used to grind seed corn. In 1875, he sold the mill to Jacob Bartles (for whom the town of Bartlesville would be named), who modified the mill to produce wheat flour. Other important agricultural crops included potatoes, sorghum and oats, as well as prairie hay and pecans. Cotton production was attempted in the early 1900s, but the soil proved unsuitable and this crop was soon discontinued.

The first commercial oil well in Oklahoma, designated as Nellie Johnstone Number One, was drilled near Bartlesville in 1897. According to the Encyclopedia of Oklahoma History and Culture, the industry developed slowly because of communal land ownership by the Cherokees, the lack of crude oil markets, and lack of reliable transportation. Bartlesville became an oil boom town only after 1900, when the nearby Osage County oil fields were developed and railroads were built into the area. In 1900, Phoenix Oil Company built a pipeline from Osage County to Bartlesville's Atchison, Topeka and Santa Fe Railway depot, where there was an oil loading facility. Oil was shipped from there to a refinery in Neodesha, Kansas in the same year. Washington County fields were developed soon afterward. The Bartlesville Field reached peak development during 1904 to 1906; the Bartlesville-Dewey Field in 1905 and the Copan, Canary, Hogshooter, and Wann fields were located in 1907. Several oil companies set up headquarters in the county, most notably Phillips Petroleum in Bartlesville.

Railroads came to this area at the turn of the 20th century. The Atchison, Topeka and Santa Fe Railway opened a line from Owen to Owasso, Oklahoma in 1899. The Missouri, Kansas and Texas Railroad opened a line from Stevens, Kansas to Dewey, Oklahoma in 1901-2 and another line from Hominy, Oklahoma to Bartlesville in 1903–04.

Geography
It is the second-smallest county in Oklahoma by land area and smallest by total area. It lies in the Eastern Lowlands physiographic region, and is drained by the Caney River. Lakes and reservoirs include Copan Lake, Silver Lake and Bar-Dew Lake.

Adjacent counties
 Montgomery County, Kansas (north)
 Nowata County (east)
 Rogers County (southeast)
 Tulsa County (south)
 Osage County (west)
 Chautauqua County, Kansas (northwest)

Demographics

As of the 2010 United States Census, there were 50,976 people, 21,036 households, and 14,123 families residing in the county.  The population density was 45/km2 (118/mi2).  There were 23,451 housing units at an average density of 55.3 per square mile (21.4/km2).  The racial makeup of the county was 93.9% white, 2.4% black or African American, 10.3% Native American, 1.1% Asian, less than 0.1% Pacific Islander, 1.7% from other races, and 6.1% from two or more races.  Five percent of the population were Hispanic or Latino of any race.

There were 21,036 households, out of which 30.1% had children under the age of 18 living with them, 52.1% were married couples living together, 11% had a female householder with no husband present, 4% had a male householder with no husband present, and 32.9% were non-families.  Individuals living alone accounted for 28.7% of households and individuals who were 65 years of age or older living alone accounted for 12.9%.  The average household size was 2.39 and the average family size was 2.91.

In the county, the population was spread out, with 23.4% under the age of 18, 8.1% from 18 to 24, 22.8% from 25 to 44, 27.9% from 45 to 64, and 17.8% who were 65 years of age or older.  The median age was 41.4 years.  For every 100 females, there were 93.7 males.  For every 100 females age 18 and over, there were 109.8 males.

The median income for a household in the county was $35,816, and the median income for a family was $43,514. Males had a median income of $34,201 versus $22,389 for females. The per capita income for the county was $20,250.  About 8.70% of families and 11.90% of the population were below the poverty line, including 15.70% of those under age 18 and 7.80% of those age 65 or over.

Politics

Communities
 Bartlesville (county seat)
 Copan
 Dewey
 Ochelata
 Ramona
 Vera

NRHP sites

The following sites in Washington County are listed on the National Register of Historic Places
 Bartlesville Downtown Historic District, Bartlesville
 Bartlesville Civic Center, Bartlesville
 Dewey Hotel, Dewey
 LaQuinta, Bartlesville
 Nellie Johnstone No. 1, Bartlesville
 Old Washington County Courthouse, Bartlesville
 Frank and Jane Phillips House, Bartlesville
 Price Tower, Bartlesville

References

External links

 Washington County's website
 Washington County History
 Oklahoma Digital Maps: Digital Collections of Oklahoma and Indian Territory

 
1907 establishments in Oklahoma
Populated places established in 1907
Tulsa metropolitan area